Dunure (Scottish Gaelic: Dùn Iùbhair, meaning Yew Hill) is a small village in the South Ayrshire area of Scotland about  from Ayr, Scotland. It is located on the coast of the Firth of Clyde, and is near to Maybole, south of Ayr.

The village is most notable for its ruined medieval castle in a clifftop setting, its small former fishing harbour nearby, and (on the opposite side of the castle from the harbour) a small plant maze known as the Dunure Labyrinth.

Village

The first buildings in the lower Dunure village were erected in the early nineteenth century, not long after improvements to the local harbour in 1811. Kennedy Hall dates from 1881 and Dunure House from around 1800. Limekilns are a common feature of small harbours and Dunure has a fine specimen at the village play park.

Fisherton Church was erected in 1938 as a chapel of ease for Dunure and district. It was rebuilt and extended in 1912. Dunduff Castle stands above Fisherton; originally a 15th-century structure, it was altered and extended in the 1980s for use as a private house. The remains of a prehistoric earthwork, the Dane's  Hill, are in a nearby field. The ruins of the pre-reformation Kirkbride church and cemetery are nearby, abandoned since the parish was combined with that of Maybole.

Harbour

The harbour is a roughly square basin with a breakwater quay, topped off by a locally characteristic cylindrical stone harbour light. The Earl of Cassillis improved the harbour at a cost of £50,000 in 1811, making the location more attractive for fishing. William Aiton records in 1808 that the sole costs of the improvements to Dunure harbour were borne by Thomas Kennedy of Dunure Esq.

Transport
There was previously a Dunure railway station in the village on the Maidens and Dunure Railway: the station closed in the 1930s.

Operated by Stagecoach West Scotland, the 361 bus service to Ayr & Straiton starts/terminates here.

Items of local interest

The substantial ruins of the infamous Dunure Castle are in the village. Dunduff Castle above Fisherton primary school has been rebuilt and is now a private home; the old parish cemetery and pre-reformation church ruins lie near Dunduff Farm.

John Keppie, a colleague of the renowned Glasgow artist, architect and type designer Charles Rennie Mackintosh, rented the house of Mainslea and a small cottage in its back garden opposite Dunure Castle for what was known as “The Roaring Camp”, a holiday home popular with young women friends of theirs from the Glasgow School of Art. It was from this base that Mackintosh set out on a sketching expedition to the abbey of Crossraguel, Baltersan and Maybole in 1895.

The mounted skeleton of the famous Clydesdale horse 'Baron of Buchlyvie' is a popular attraction for the Kelvingrove Museum and Art Galleries in Glasgow. The Baron finished his days at Dunure Mains Farm and was originally buried there.

A labyrinth has been constructed in a hollow on the headland overlooked by the castle.  In May 2008 local community councillor Andy Guthrie was awarded £3,990 from Awards for All to construct the labyrinth with the help of the village, B.T.C.V., C.S.V., Dunure Community Council, and Fisherton primary school. The Dunure Labyrinth has proved popular across the world, and even has its own Facebook page. It was given an 'Action Earth' award, and a biodiversity award from Scottish Natural Heritage. Jeff Saward, an international expert on the subject, gave advice on the history of labyrinths. It is looked after by volunteers from the village and pagan groups from around Scotland (its creators, Andy and Helen Guthrie, being locally well-known pagans), and is open all year.

The famous Electric Brae is located on the main road (where national speed limit of 60mph applies) near the village: its nickname comes from the optical illusion that it is going slightly uphill instead of down

References

External links

 Dunure Community Council Dunure Community Council Web Site
 Pictures of Dunure
 Pictures of Dunduff Castle
 Video footage of the Dunure Labyrinth
 Video footage of the Dunure Doocot
 Video footage of the Dunure Quadrant Tower

Villages in Carrick, Scotland
Ports and harbours of Scotland